Brzyska  is a village in Jasło County, Subcarpathian Voivodeship, in south-eastern Poland. It is the seat of the gmina (administrative district) called Gmina Brzyska.

The village has a population of 1,900.

References

Villages in Jasło County
Lesser Poland
Kingdom of Galicia and Lodomeria
Kraków Voivodeship (1919–1939)